The Chelsea Parade Historic District encompasses a predominantly residential area north of downtown Norwich. Centered around the Chelsea Parade, a triangular public park, the area has long been a preferred residential area for the city's upper classes, and includes a catalog of architecture from the 18th to 20th centuries. The district was listed on the National Register of Historic Places in 1989.

Description and history
Norwich's first area of settlement was Norwichtown near the Yantic River, but it quickly developed a commercial port called Chelsea Landing further south, where the Yantic and Shetucket Rivers meet to form the Thames.  Initially common pastureland, the Chelsea Parade area was subdivided in 1726, and in 1740 roads were built through the area, joining Norwichtown and the port.  By the late 18th century, Norwich was the largest city in Connecticut.  The Chelsea Parade area was from the late 18th century a desirable residential area, where the city's wealthy built their houses.  The Chelsea Parade was set aside as a public common in 1797, and gradually became more like a public park, around which residential and civic buildings were built.  It continued to be a fashionable address through the 19th century, as the city's business shifted from maritime commerce to textiles and other manufacturing, powered by the nearby rivers.  One of the grandest estates near the Parade was established by John Fox Slater, the grandson of early textile pioneer Samuel Slater; only the carriage house survives.  The Slaters supported the founding of Norwich Free Academy, located in the district, as well as founding the Slater Memorial Museum.

The historic district is roughly in the shape of a teardrop, with Washington Street and Broadway, the roads flanking Chelsea Parade, as its principal thoroughfares.  More densely-built residential areas on either side are included in the district.  It includes several properties previously listed on the National Register, including the Nathaniel Backus House, the Broad Street School, and the Converse House and Barn. Other notable buildings include the Park Congregational Church (UCC), and St. Patrick Cathedral.

See also
Neighborhoods of Norwich, Connecticut
National Register of Historic Places listings in New London County, Connecticut

References

Historic districts in New London County, Connecticut
Georgian architecture in Connecticut
National Register of Historic Places in New London County, Connecticut
Norwich, Connecticut
Historic districts on the National Register of Historic Places in Connecticut